Statistics of Empress's Cup in the 2003 season.

Overview
It was contested by 23 teams, and Tasaki Perule FC won the championship.

Results

1st round
Honda FC 1-6 Kanagawa University
Albirex Niigata 2-1 Renaissance Kumamoto FC
Bucchigiri FC 0-8 AS Elfen Sayama FC
Hokkaido Bunkyo University Meisei High School 4-1 Kibi International University
JEF United Ichihara 1-5 Nippon Sport Science University
Shimizudaihachi SC 0-5 Hinomoto Gakuen High School
Tokiwagi Gakuken High School 1-2 Hoo High School

2nd round
Tasaki Perule FC 5-0 Kanagawa University
Albirex Niigata 0-2 Speranza FC Takatsuki
YKK Tohoku LSC Flappers 4-0 AS Elfen Sayama FC
Hokkaido Bunkyo University Meisei High School 0-7 Saitama Reinas FC
Nippon TV Beleza 5-0 Nippon Sport Science University
Hinomoto Gakuen High School 1-3 Ohara Gakuen JaSRA
Okayama Yunogo Belle 3-1 Takarazuka Bunnys
Hoo High School 1-5 Iga FC Kunoichi

Quarterfinals
Tasaki Perule FC 3-0 Speranza FC Takatsuki
YKK Tohoku LSC Flappers 0-2 Saitama Reinas FC
Nippon TV Beleza 3-1 Ohara Gakuen JaSRA
Okayama Yunogo Belle 1-5 Iga FC Kunoichi

Semifinals
Tasaki Perule FC 1-0 Saitama Reinas FC
Nippon TV Beleza 3-0 Iga FC Kunoichi

Final
Tasaki Perule FC 2-2 (pen 5-3) Nippon TV Beleza
Tasaki Perule FC won the championship.

References

Empress's Cup
2003 in Japanese women's football